Pashand (or Fashand) is a village in Savojbolagh County, Alborz Province 75 km west of the Iranian capital of Tehran.

Parishes 
Pashand includes two main region entitled down (or jirma:le) and top-region (Juar ma:le). Each one also divides into some zones as Smithy-area (Angarma:le), (hoshtekola), Back-Garden (poshte bagh), tekki, ra:sto kucho (Direct-alley) etc.

References 
This article is based on a translation from the corresponding article on the Persian Wikipedia.

Populated places in Tehran Province